Power Over Men is a 1929 British silent mystery film directed by George Banfield and starring Isabel Jeans, Jameson Thomas and Wyndham Standing. It was made at Walthamstow Studios in London.

Cast
 Isabel Jeans as Marion Delacour 
 Jameson Thomas as Philippe Garnier 
 Wyndham Standing as Émile Delacour 
 Gibb McLaughlin as Alexandre Billot 
 Jerrold Robertshaw as Fournier 
 James Knight as Cesa 
 Franklyn Bellamy as Bottomley 
 Gabrielle Morton as Maid

References

Bibliography
 Low, Rachel. The History of British Film: Volume IV, 1918–1929. Routledge, 1997.
 Wood, Linda. British Films, 1927-1939. British Film Institute, 1986.

External links

1929 films
British mystery films
British silent feature films
1929 mystery films
Films directed by George Banfield
Films shot at Walthamstow Studios
British black-and-white films
1920s English-language films
1920s British films
Silent mystery films